{{Automatic taxobox
| image             = Mannikin Bronze 2007 04 08 0545b, crop.jpg
| image_caption     = Bronze mannikin (Spermestes cucullata)
| taxon             = Spermestes
| authority         = Swainson, 1837
| type_species = Spermestes cucullatabronze mannikin
| type_species_authority = Swainson, 1837
| subdivision_ranks = Species
| subdivision       = 
See text
}}Spermestes is a genus of small seed-eating birds in the family Estrildidae. They are distributed across Sub-Saharan Africa.

Taxonomy  
The genus Spermestes was introduced in 1837 by the English naturalist William John Swainson to accommodate the bronze mannikin. The name combines the Ancient Greek sperma meaning "seed" and -estēs meaning "-eater".

Based on the results of a molecular phylogenetic study published in 2020, this genus was resurrected for a clade of species that were formerly assigned to the genera Lonchura and Odontospiza''.

Species
The genus contains four species:

References

 
Bird genera
Taxa named by William John Swainson